The terms Indian Country, Indian Reserve, Indian Reservation, Indian Territory and Indian Land may be easily confused. Articles on related topics are titled as follows:

Places

Places for groups of Indigenous peoples to live
 Indian colony, land reserved for urban Indian settlements, especially in Nevada and California
 Indian country (collectively or individually), the many self-governing Native American communities throughout the United States
 Indian reservation, a similar area for Native American tribes in the United States
 List of Indian reservations in the United States
 Indian reserve, land reserved for First Nation peoples in Canada
 Urban Indian reserve, an urban area later designated for First Nation peoples in Canada
 List of Indian reserves in Canada
 Indigenous territory (Brazil)
 Indigenous territory (Bolivia)
 Indigenous territory (Colombia)
 Indigenous territory (Costa Rica)
 Lands inhabited by indigenous peoples, a more worldwide discussion of the topic

Other geographic areas
 Indian Land, South Carolina, a community in South Carolina 
 Indian Mound Reserve, a park in Ohio, United States
 Indian Reserve (1763), a territory in British colonial America ceded by France to Britain and created by the Royal Proclamation of 1763
 Indian Territory, a historical territory in the United States of America
 Indiana Territory, a historical territory in the United States
 Union Territory, a sub-national administrative division of India that are ruled directly by the federal national government

Arts, entertainment, and media
 Indian Country, a 1953 collection of stories by Dorothy M. Johnson 
 Indian Country Today, a Native American news magazine
 "Indian Reservation", a 1979 song by Orlando Riva Sound (O.R.S.)
 "Indian Reservation (The Lament of the Cherokee Reservation Indian)", a 1971 hit song by Paul Revere and the Raiders
 Indian Country, a 2017 novel by Kurt Schlichter

Affirmative action program
 Reservation in India, an affirmative action program in India

See also
Indian barrier state